The Chinese Taipei participated at the 16th Asian Games in Guangzhou, China.

Medal table

Medalist

See also
Sockgate

References
Official website — Chinese Taipei medalists

Nations at the 2010 Asian Games
2010
Asian Games